Joaquín Vivani (born 17 January 1995) is an Argentine professional footballer who plays as a forward for Ferro de General Pico.

Career
Vivani is a product of the Atlético 9 de Julio and Boca Juniors academies, with the forward going on to join Once Tigres. He featured in Torneo Argentino C in 2011, making three appearances as they won promotion to Torneo Argentino B. One goal in seventeen matches followed in the fourth tier. In 2013, Vivani joined Primera B Nacional side Sarmiento. He was moved into their senior set-up in the 2016–17 season, with the club now in the Primera División. His debut in professional football came on 8 May 2017 versus Banfield, before he scored twice in his second appearance against Patronato; netting as a second-half substitute in a 2–2 draw.

Vivani spent the 2019–20 campaign out on loan in Torneo Federal A with Ferro Carril Oeste. He scored once, versus Círculo Deportivo, in twenty-three fixtures for them. In November 2020, Vivani signed with Real Pilar. He returned to Ferro Carril Oeste in February 2021.

Career statistics
.

References

External links

1995 births
Living people
Sportspeople from Buenos Aires Province
Argentine footballers
Association football forwards
Torneo Argentino C players
Torneo Argentino B players
Argentine Primera División players
Primera Nacional players
Torneo Federal A players
Club Atlético Sarmiento footballers
Independiente Rivadavia footballers